Mehdi Aliyari (born 13 March 1989) is an Iranian Greco-Roman wrestler.

References 
 Profile

1989 births
Living people
Asian Games gold medalists for Iran
Asian Games medalists in wrestling
Wrestlers at the 2014 Asian Games
Iranian male sport wrestlers
Medalists at the 2014 Asian Games
Universiade medalists in wrestling
Universiade bronze medalists for Iran
World Wrestling Championships medalists
Medalists at the 2013 Summer Universiade
Asian Wrestling Championships medalists
20th-century Iranian people
21st-century Iranian people